AMSH-like protease is an enzyme that in humans is encoded by the STAMBPL1 gene.

References

Further reading